Botwood is a town in north-central Newfoundland, Newfoundland and Labrador, Canada in Census Division 6. It is located on the west shore of the Bay of Exploits on a natural deep water harbour used by cargo ships and seaplanes throughout the town's history. Botwood was the North American terminus for the first transatlantic commercial flights.

History
In 1908, construction began on the Botwood Railway; the railway ran between Bishop's Falls and Botwood. It was a joint effort between the A.N.D. Company and the A. E. Reed Company of Bishop's Falls. It was to be the transportation link for the export of pulp and paper from the newly built mill at Grand Falls, NL. The railway became operational by the fall of 1909, and the first shipment of paper from the new mill was sent in February 1910.  The A.N.D. Company took control of the railway operation in 1910, just a year after the line was completed.

The first aircraft facility to be established in Botwood was by Newfoundland born Captain Sydney Bennett (1897–1945) and Australian-born Major Sidney Cotton (1894–1969). From 1937 to 1945, both Pan Am and the British Overseas Airways Corporation used Botwood as a terminal for their Atlantic crossings. On June 27, 1939 the Yankee Clipper left Botwood for the first Trans-Atlantic passenger flight to Foynes, Ireland, its counterpart terminal for the shortest route to Europe.

Botwood became host to many dignitaries and celebrities, some as part of official delegations and others who were stalled there waiting out inclement flying weather. In 1943 Bob Hope and his troupe were stormbound in Botwood and performed for the RCAF Coastal Command. Franklin Delano Roosevelt, Winston Churchill and Charles Lindbergh are among some of the other well-known figures that have stayed in the town.

During World War II (1940–1945), the Royal Canadian Air Force changed Botwood into a patrolling and bombing seaplane base. It was home to two squadrons of PBY Canso flying boats equipped with torpedoes and depth charges. A large concrete slipway, two hangars, a tarmac and four bunkers were constructed.

The Canadian Army was garrisoned in the town, and built barracks, a water system, and a full-scale military hospital. The army was responsible for the manning of gun batteries at Philip's Head and Wiseman's Cove that protected the entrance to Botwood Harbour with 10" guns, as well as numerous anti-aircraft batteries throughout the community. During the war Botwood was home to approximately 10,000 Canadian and British personnel, and became Canada's most important overseas base. (Newfoundland and Labrador did not become part of Canada until 1949.)

In October 1942, an American Export Airlines Sikorsky VS-44 flying boat, the Excalibur, crashed and sank in the Bay of Exploits shortly after takeoff. 11 military personnel died; 26 survived. In November 1943 a Canso flying boat crashed killing 7 personnel, while 5 survived.

Military personnel left Botwood at the end of World War II. Military buildings were sold, demolished or relocated. The commercial seaplane service ended in 1945 as land-based aircraft became more popular. Botwood continued to ship paper from the Grand Falls-Windsor paper mill until its closure in 2009. It also shipped ore from Buchans until the mine closed in 1984.

Botwood was profiled on Still Standing (Canadian TV series) on an episode that aired December 1, 2020.

Demographics 

Tourism
In 2010, a mural to celebrate the Botwood Cottage Hospital was commissioned by the Botwood Mural Arts Society. It was entitled Pulse of the Community and was painted by Manitoban artist Charlie Johnston. It is located on the previous site of the Botwood Cottage Hospital, now the site of a grocery store. This was the beginning of an ongoing project by the society to commission murals throughout the town to celebrate its unique history and increase tourism.

A number of other murals have been completed around the town. As of October 2019 there are thirteen murals, including the following:
Twilight of Airmail, The Pulse of the Community, Come Home and Remodulating Nous / Making Waves by Charlie Johnston
Sceviour's Sawmill by local artist, Caroline Noseworthy-Dawe
The Water Nipper by Newfoundland artist Lloyd Pretty
Botwood WWII History 1939-45, Salute to Our Veterans, The Two R's and Clash of Culturesby Craig Goudie
The Path We've Built by Fernanda Gonzalez Latrecchiana
Honouring Our Fallen, Supporting Our Future by Ciaran Gallagher
Answering the Call by Marat Danilyan

Climate

See also
 List of cities and towns in Newfoundland and Labrador

References

External links
 Town of Botwood Website

Populated coastal places in Canada
Towns in Newfoundland and Labrador
Port cities and towns on the Canadian Atlantic coast